The 1967–68 NBA season was the Rockets' 1st season in the NBA.

Offseason

Draft picks

Roster

Regular season

Season standings

Record vs. opponents

Game log

References

Houston Rockets seasons
San Diego